Petrus Ebersohn Kruger  (born 11 April 1958) is a South African former rugby union player who played two test matches for the Springboks.

Playing career
Kruger made his provincial debut for Northern Transvaal in 1981. After five seasons with Northern Transvaal he moved to Transvaal at the beginning of the 1986 season.  Kruger made his debut for the Springboks in the third test against the New Zealand Cavaliers on 24 May 1986 at Loftus Versfeld in Pretoria, when he and Frans Erasmus replaced the props from the first two tests, Anton Barnard and Flippie van der Merwe.

Test history

See also
List of South Africa national rugby union players – Springbok no. 550

References

1958 births
Living people
South African rugby union players
South Africa international rugby union players
People from Brits, North West
Rugby union players from North West (South African province)
Rugby union props
Blue Bulls players